"Early One Morning" (Roud V9617) is an English folk song with lyrics first found in publications as far back as 1787. A broadside ballad sheet in the Bodleian Library, Oxford, dated between 1828 and 1829  has the title "The Lamenting Maid" and refers to the lover leaving to become a sailor.

The now well-known melody was first printed by William Chappell in his publication National English Airs c.1855-1859. The melody may be derived from an earlier song "The Forsaken Lover". Chappell wrote in his later Popular Music of the Olden Time: 

If I were required to name three of the most popular songs among the servant-maids of the present generation, I should say, from my own experience, that they are Cupid's Garden, I sow'd the seeds of love, and Early one morning. I have heard Early one morning sung by servants who came from Leeds, from Hereford and from Devonshire, and by others from parts nearer to London. The tune... was, I believe first printed in my collection.... from one of the penny song-books collected by Ritson, and it is curious that scarcely any two copies agree beyond the second line, although the subject is always the same - a damsel's complaint for the loss of her lover.

This tune was also used as the opening and closing theme to the beloved Canadian children's short programme, The Friendly Giant (1958-1985).

Lyrics

Early one morning,Just as the sun was rising,I heard a young maid sing,In the valley below.

CHORUS:
Oh, don't deceive me,Oh, never leave me,How could you useA poor maiden so?

Remember the vows,That you made to your Mary,Remember the bow'r,Where you vowed to be true,

Chorus

Oh Gay is the garland,And fresh are the roses,I've culled from the garden,To place upon thy brow.

Chorus

Thus sang the poor maiden,Her sorrows bewailing,Thus sang the poor maid,In the valley below.

Chorus

Another version:

Early one morningjust as the sun was rising,I heard a young maid singin the valley below.

Oh, don't deceive me,Oh, never leave me,How could you useA poor maiden so?

Remember the vows thatyou made to me truly,Remember how tenderlyyou nestled close to me.

Gay is the garlandfresh are the rosesI've culled from the gardento bind over thee.

Here I now wanderalone as I wonderWhy did you leave meto sigh and complain.

I ask of the roseswhy should I be forsaken,Why must I here in sorrow remain?

Through yonder grove by the spring that is running,There you and I have so merrily played,Kissing and courting and gently sporting,Oh, my innocent heart you've betrayed.

Soon you will meet with another pretty maiden,Some pretty maiden,you'll court her for a while.

Thus ever rangingturning and changing,Always seeking for a girl that is new.

Thus sung the maiden,her sorrows bewailingThus sung the maidin the valley below

Oh, don't deceive me,Oh, never leave me,How could you useA poor maiden so?

Arrangements
The folk song is used in a number of well known folk-song arrangements, for example by the English composers Benjamin Britten and Gordon Jacob along with the Australian composer Percy Aldridge Grainger. Its melody forms the opening bars of the "Radio 4 UK Theme" by Fritz Spiegl, which was played every morning at the switch-on of BBC Radio 4 from late 1978 until April 2006. The melody was also adapted by Sir Francis Vivian Dunn as a military slow march called "The Globe and Laurel", created for the Band of the Royal Marines in 1935. The melody is one of the main themes of the "Nell Gwyn Overture" by Edward German.

Recordings
Sarah Brightman, on The Trees They Grow So High. 
Eva Cassidy, on Somewhere.
Hayley Mills and Nancy Olson sang the song in the 1960 Disney film Pollyanna.
Jim Moray sang the song in his album Sweet England.
Nana Mouskouri on Quand tu chantes.
 The Tornados recorded an instrumental rock version under the name "Blackpool Rock"

References

External links
Early One Morning - MIDI

English folk songs